Mount Henderson is a hill  west-northwest of Isolation Point in the south-central part of White Island, in the Ross Archipelago, Antarctica. It was named by the New Zealand Geological Survey Antarctic Expedition (1958–59) for G.B. Henderson, a member of that expedition.

References

Mountains of the Ross Dependency
White Island (Ross Archipelago)